Jean Benedetti (1930–2012) was an actor and playwright best known for his studies of Konstantin Stanislavski.

Selected works 

Books
 Gilles de Rais biography (1972)
 Stanislavski: An Introduction (1982)
 Stanislavski: A Biography (1989)
 Stanislavski and The Actor (1998)
 Garrick and the Birth of Modern Theatre (2001)

Plays
 The Good Shoemaker and the Poor Fish Peddler (1965)

References 

1930 births
2012 deaths